The Iglesia María Auxiliadora is a Roman Catholic parish church in Villa Colón, Montevideo, Uruguay. The church was completed in 1877. 

The church is dedicated to Mary Help of Christians, a Marian devotion deeply held and propagated by Saint John Bosco (Don Bosco). The temple was declared a National Votive Sanctuary by Archbishop Mariano Soler, who blessed it personally in 1901.

The temple is part of a larger complex dominated by the private school "Colegio Pío IX", operated by the Salesians of Don Bosco since its establishment in the second half of the 19th century. 

The parish is one of seven in Uruguay dedicated to Mary Help of Christians, including María Auxiliadora in Montevideo's Parque Rodó neighbourhood, as well as churches in other municipalities around the country (Casupá, Castillos, General Enrique Martínez, Guichón and Vichadero).

References

External links

1919 establishments in Uruguay
Roman Catholic churches completed in 1877
Roman Catholic church buildings in Montevideo
Salesian churches in Uruguay
19th-century Roman Catholic church buildings in Uruguay